Lyn-Lake is a commercial district in south Minneapolis.  At the core is the intersection of Lake Street and Lyndale Avenue from which Lyn-Lake takes its name.  This is also at the intersection of four Minneapolis neighborhoods: Whittier on the northeast, Lyndale on the southeast, South Uptown on the southwest, and Lowry Hill East on the northwest.  Most residents who consider themselves part of the "Lyn-Lake neighborhood" originate from the southeast corner of the Lyndale neighborhood. Lyn-Lake was branded by the Lyn-Lake Business Association in 1999.

Locally, Lyn-Lake is mostly known as being just east of the Uptown district of Minneapolis and previously considered an extension of Uptown. One of the oldest anchors was the It's Greek to Me restaurant on the northeast corner.

The district contains ethnic restaurants, LGBT establishments, and niche retail. 

North of Lyn-Lake is the Midtown Greenway bicycle and pedestrian path. Regional access by car is through I-35W from the east and I-94 from the north.

Open Streets Minneapolis and the Lyn Lake Street Festival are the signature events for the area and draw over 20,000 from the local community annually.

References

Neighborhoods in Minneapolis
Streets in Minneapolis